Reshma may refer to:

People
Jahura Akhter Reshma, Bangladeshi weightlifter
Reshma, Pakistani folk singer
Reshma (actress), Indian film actress
Reshma Bhandari, Nepali volleyball player
Reshma Bombaywala, Indian model, jewellery designer, and actress
Reshma Gandhi, Indian cricketer
Reshma Mane, Indian wrestler
Reshma Nilofer Naha, Indian maritime pilot
Reshma Pasupuleti, Indian film and television actress
Reshma Patel, Indian politician
Reshma Pathan, Indian stuntwoman
Reshma Qureshi, Indian model, vlogger, and activist
Reshma Rajan, Indian film actress
Reshma Rathore, Indian actress and model
Reshma Saujani, American lawyer and politician
Reshma Shetty, British-American television and film actress
Reshma Thomas, Indian social worker
Reshma Valliappan, Malaysian activist

Films
Reshma Aur Shera, 1971 Hindi crime drama film 
Reshma Ki Jawani, Hindi remake of Layanam

Other
Reshma (air base), former Soviet air base